Ahmer Saeed (born 21 November 1978) is a Pakistani cricketer. A former captain of the Pakistan U-19 cricket team, Saeed went on to play first-class cricket for Karachi from 1997 until 2005. A right-hand bat and occasional right-arm off break bowler, Saeed amassed 1,579 runs at 26.76 in the four day game, with three centuries, and 385 one day runs at 32.08 with a single century. His occasional bowling snared 15 first-class wickets at 49.53, and 11 one day wickets at a more successful 27.63.

Saeed came to first-class cricket from a career in the Pakistani Youth Test team between 1995 and 1997, where he played 11 matches and returned 602 runs at 33.44 and seven wickets at 61.85. He also played 12 Youth One Day International games, scoring 371 runs at 30.91 and taking 12 wickets at a contrasting 19.00. He earned a Player of the Match award on 8 January 1997, during a Youth ODI against England where he scored 63 and took one wicket.

Saeed made a brief foray into Twenty20 cricket with two consecutive matches in April 2005, however made only nine runs and went for 12 in his only over with the ball. Having left the one day game over the winter of 2004/05, he played his final match on 27 November 2005, departing from the game with four runs and 10 wicketless overs. He went on to play a handful of matches for various club teams, and for the Karachi Port Trust, whom he captained for a time.

Notes

External links

1978 births
Pakistani cricketers
Living people
Muhajir people
Cricketers from Karachi
Karachi Urban cricketers
Karachi Port Trust cricketers
Karachi Whites cricketers
Karachi Dolphins cricketers
Karachi Blues cricketers
Public Works Department cricketers
Redco Pakistan Limited cricketers